Donald Delbert Jardine (March 24, 1940 – December 16, 2006) was a Canadian professional wrestler best known for his masked gimmick as The Spoiler. Jardine was a major star in various wrestling promotions. He worked in the World Wrestling Federation, first in 1974 and again from 1984 to 1986. But Jardine saw his greatest successes in the National Wrestling Alliance affiliated territories of Championship Wrestling from Florida, Georgia Championship Wrestling and Big Time Wrestling, which would eventually become known as World Class Championship Wrestling, from the early 1960s through the mid 1980s.

Professional wrestling career
Jardine began wrestling in the mid-1950s, making his debut in 1955 at the age of 15. He made his Maple Leaf Gardens debut in 1959 as "Babyface" Don Jardine, a protégé of Whipper Billy Watson and wrestled primarily in Toronto until 1961 and returned briefly in 1964. In 1964, Jardine wrestled NWA World Heavyweight Champion Lou Thesz on TV in St. Louis, but did not win the title. Jardine also wrestled as The Butcher in Los Angeles in 1964. Whilst wrestling under "The Butcher" moniker, he teamed with both Mad Dog Vachon and Dutch Savage for a short time. He challenged Gene Kiniski for the NWA World Heavyweight Championship in 1966. He became one of the top masked wrestlers in the Southern United States, particularly in Texas, where The Spoiler was created by Fritz Von Erich in 1967. He famously walked the top rope, a move he would teach to Mark Calaway (the future Undertaker) in the mid-1980s while competing in World Class Championship Wrestling.

He was unmasked in Texas in 1972 by Billy Red Lyons and Red Bastein and identified as Don Jardine, still, he continued to wrestle under the mask as "The Spoiler" in Texas and Oklahoma. The Spoiler also wrestled in All Japan Pro Wrestling and New Japan Pro-Wrestling during the 1960s and 1970s. He became the Super Destroyer and was brought into the Carolinas by George Scott in 1973 and also used the "Super Destroyer" name during his stint in the AWA (1977–78). Jardine was one of the key workers, along with Johnny Valentine, who turned the Mid-Atlantic territory around and established hot singles wrestling programs in what had traditionally been a tag team territory. Jardine challenged Jack Brisco for the NWA World Heavyweight Championship as both the Super Destroyer and The Spoiler, and wrestled Harley Race for the NWA Heavyweight title in a main event in Houston, Texas in 1979. He held the Georgia-based NWA National Heavyweight Championship and was briefly billed as NWA National Heavyweight Champion by the World Wrestling Federation after it bought out Georgia Championship Wrestling in July 1984.

The Spoiler wrestled 75 matches for the World Wrestling Federation in 1974 before leaving for other promotions. He returned to the WWF and had his first match back for a TV taping in Poughkeepsie, New York on July 30, 1984 defeating Jeff Lang and wrestled for a few years until his last match in the WWF on January 21, 1986 in Los Angeles, California defeating Billy Anderson. The Spoiler, along with Jake "The Snake" Roberts and the 400-pound King Kong Bundy, joined forces with a newly emerging tag team, The Road Warriors, to form the original Legion of Doom. The Spoiler once headlined against WWF Champion Pedro Morales in Madison Square Garden, wrestling maskless because, at that time, the arena had a rule barring masked wrestlers from performing. The Spoiler appeared in a historic match against Mil Mascaras, the Mexican legend, marking the first time a wrestler (Mascaras) ever wore a mask into a ring in New York State. The Spoiler's matches against Chief Jay Strongbow and Sonny King were long-lasting feuds that enjoyed successful runs across the WWF circuit. His "Iron Claw" was the first maneuver to be censored from the TV screen by the WWF in a 'reverse psych' move to sell tickets. Jardine promoted some shows in Tampa, Florida in 1993-94 and then retired from wrestling.

Personal life
Jardine spent the later years of his life in Wetaskiwin, Alberta, Canada with his wife and son, where he was the manager of a car wash business. Jardine was known to make clay sculptures and carved faces in the bark of cotton wood trees. He also volunteered for the Literacy Program, teaching young children to read.

On December 16, 2006, Jardine died due to complications from a heart attack and leukemia in Red Deer, Alberta, Canada, and was writing a novel based on his professional wrestling career at the time of his death. He had also been battling pneumonia, and went into cardiac arrest followed by a coma he would never recover from. He was 66.

Championships and accomplishments
Atlantic Grand Prix Wrestling
AGPW North American Tag Team Championship (1 time) – with Nikita Kalmikoff
Central States Wrestling
NWA Central States Heavyweight Championship (1 time)
Championship Wrestling from Florida
NWA Florida Heavyweight Championship (3 times)
NWA Southern Heavyweight Championship (Florida version) (1 time)
Georgia Championship Wrestling
NWA Georgia Heavyweight Championship (3 times)
NWA National Heavyweight Championship (2 times)
Gulf Coast Championship Wrestling
NWA Mississippi Heavyweight Championship (2 times)
NWA All-Star Wrestling
NWA Canadian Tag Team Championship (Vancouver version) (1 time) - with Dutch Savage
NWA World Tag Team Championship (Vancouver version) (2 times) – with Dutch Savage
NWA Big Time Wrestling
NWA American Heavyweight Championship (4 times)
NWA American Tag Team Championship (6 times) – with Gary Hart (3), Smasher Sloan (2) and Mark Lewin (2)
NWA Brass Knuckles Championship (Texas version) (1 time)
NWA Texas Heavyweight Championship (2 times)
NWA Texas Tag Team Championship (1 time) – with Mark Lewin
NWA United States Heavyweight Championship (Texas version) (1 time)
NWA Television Championship (3 times)
NWA Mid-America
City of Mobile Heavyweight Championship (1 time)
NWA Tennessee Tag Team Championship (1 time) - with Spoiler #2
NWA Tri-State
NWA North American Heavyweight Championship (Tri-State version) (3 times)
NWA United States Tag Team Championship (Tri-State version) (3 times) – with Buddy Wolfe (2) and Dusty Rhodes (1)
World Championship Wrestling (Australia)
IWA World Heavyweight Championship (1 time)
IWA World Tag Team Championship (3 times) – with Mario Milano (1) and Waldo Von Erich (2)

Luchas de Apuestas record

Notes

References

External links

Page of Fame

 

1940 births
2006 deaths
Canadian male professional wrestlers
Deaths from cancer in Alberta
Deaths from leukemia
Faux East Asian professional wrestlers
Masked wrestlers
Professional wrestlers from New Brunswick
Professional wrestling trainers
Sportspeople from Moncton
Stampede Wrestling alumni
20th-century professional wrestlers
NWA National Heavyweight Champions
NWA Florida Heavyweight Champions
NWA Florida Tag Team Champions
NWA Southern Heavyweight Champions (Florida version)
WCWA Brass Knuckles Champions
NWA Americas Tag Team Champions
IWA World Heavyweight Champions (Australia)
IWA World Tag Team Champions (Australia)
NWA Georgia Heavyweight Champions